Freddie Burke Frederick (January 13, 1921 in San Francisco – January 31, 1986 in Glendale, California) was an American child actor. He played Jackie Howell in the 1930 Paramount Pictures film Ladies Love Brutes.

Filmography
 Fangs of Justice as Sonny Morgan (1926)
 Smith's New Home (short) (1927)
 The Crowd as Junior (1928)
 Marry the Girl as Sonny  (1928)
 New Year's Eve as Little Brother (1929)
 Blue Skies as Richard Lewis (age 8) (1929)
 Evidence as Kenyon Wimborne (1929)
 Wall Street as Richard Tabor (1929)
 Second Wife as Walter Fairchild Junior (1930)
 Ladies Love Brutes as Jackie Howell (1930)
 Love Is Like That as Junior Carter (1930)
 Viennese Nights as Otto Stirner Jr. (uncredited) (1930)
 Mothers Cry  as Arthur as a Child (uncredited) (1930)
 The Spy as Kalya (1931)
 The Iron Master as Little Billy (1933)

References

External links
 

American male child actors
American male film actors
1921 births
1986 deaths
Male actors from San Francisco
Male actors from the San Francisco Bay Area
20th-century American male actors